The United Party of Retirees and Pensioners (PURP) is a Portuguese political party focused on securing the rights of pensioners. It was founded by António Mateus Dias and Fernando Loureiro and registered by the Portuguese Constitutional Court on 13 July 2015. It contested the Portuguese legislative election, 2015 and the European Parliament election, 2019.

The party is generally anti-austerity and sees itself as a defender of the weak and vulnerable in Portuguese society, which also includes people in poor, neglected inland areas. They claim to be "defending the values of human dignity, freedom, justice and solidarity". Their main goal is to raise minimum pensions to the national minimum wage. Other goals are promoting transparency in the public sector, preventing corruption and cronyism, securing free health and education for ordinary people, non-discrimination on the grounds of age, race, religion and gender and separating political power from economic power.

Environmentalism 
PURP states that it wants to secure environmental protection and promote sustainable development, as a precautionary principle for future generations.

Foreign policy 
In foreign policy, the party defends that Portugal should advocate regulation of the economic and financial system at the global level as well as the abolition of tax havens and support the UN in obtaining these goals.

References

External links
 

2015 establishments in Portugal
Conservative parties in Portugal
Pensioners' parties
Political parties established in 2015
Political parties in Portugal